The Scott Family Amazeum is a 501(c)(3) nonprofit, interactive children's museum of STEAM (science, technology, engineering, art, and math) based experiences for families located in Bentonville, Arkansas, USA.

Background

Name and Logo 
Combining the words “Amazing” and “Museum,” the name “Amazeum” captures the excitement, intrigue, and curiosity that embodies the Amazeum experience. The three shapes within the Amazeum’s logo - a leaf, lightning bolt (Zing), and hand representing the museum’s experience. The leaf - growth and nature, the Zing or lightning bolt for the “aha” moments at the museum, and the hand for the hands-on nature of the exhibits for children and families.

History 
Discussions among community leaders of creating a children's museum in Northwest Arkansas began in the early 2000s, with the early group obtaining 501(c)(3) non-profit status in 2006. Fundraising continued during the following years. The official groundbreaking was held in April 2014, and the grand opening of the Amazeum was held in July 2015.

Major fundraising was conducted for nearly a decade prior to the opening of the museum. One of the major contributors to the museum is former Walmart CEO Lee Scott and his family, as well as the Walton Family Foundation among others.

The museum initially expected an annual attendance of 160,000, but welcomed 311,000 visitors in their first full year, and over one million visitors by its fourth anniversary.

Facility 

The 52,000-square-foot entire facility has earned LEED Silver certification and is designed to show how the building is constructed as much as possible, with exposed supports and connections.

The Amazeum grounds feature a number of cycling and pedestrian trails offering direct pedestrian access to Crystal Bridges and the rest of Bentonville.

The main facility has won multiple awards for its design and construction.

Awards of note:

 2016 Regional Excellence Wood Design Award from Building Design+Construction and Woodworks in recognition of its use of natural materials and its integration into the surrounding Ozark environment.
 2016 Excellence in Hot-Dip Galvanizing Award in Building and Architecture from the American Galvanizers Association
 2016 Excellence in Construction Award from the Associated Builders and Contractors (ABC) of Arkansas

Exhibits 
The museum currently offers visitors the following unique permanent exhibit areas.

 Tinkering Hub
 Hershey's Lab *
 The Neighborhood Market
 Art Studio
 Canopy Climber
 Lift, Load & Haul
 Cloud Theater
 Water Amazements
 Homestead Cabin and Farm
 Cave
 Nickelodeon Play Lab
 Studio Grow
 Emerging Explorers
 Outdoor Playscape

Additionally there is a rotating exhibit area which refreshes several times a year with new or traveling exhibits.

* The Hershey's lab is the only exhibit of its kind outside of the Hershey Company Headquarters in Hershey, Pennsylvania.

Educational Outreach

Unfield Trips 
Unfield Trips are a twist added to traditional school field trips, they provide unique resources to empower teachers and inspire learning before, during, and after the visit. In the museum

and virtually, our skilled educators will spark curiosity, and the discovery will naturally continue back in the classroom. Thanks to the generous support of the Walmart Foundation, admission and virtual resources are free for pre-K through 12th grade public, private, homeschool, and charter school students in Benton and Washington counties.

Making Spaces Program 
The Amazeum partners with the Maker Education Initiative and the Children's Museum of Pittsburgh (CMP) to provide local schools with guidance, professional development, and support to jump start and sustain maker education in classrooms.

References

External links 
 Official website

Children's museums in the United States
Museums in Benton County, Arkansas
Buildings and structures in Bentonville, Arkansas